Chicholi is a census town and a municipal committee in Betul district  in the state of Madhya Pradesh, India. Most of its people depend on farming and business. This city is surrounded by three lakes and two small rivers. Famous Hindu Temple  Chandi Mata  is situated in chicholi tehsil. Famous  Bhoot Mela   (Ghost Fair) at malajpur village is just 7 km away from the chicholi. Wheat maze soyabean are the main crops of the town. Average rainfall of the chicholi is 1053mm per year.
Highest Temperature is about to 45~47℃ and lowest is approx 4~5℃.
Nearest Railway station is Betul Railway station.

Demographics 
 India census,  Chicholi is a Nagar Panchayat city in district of Betul, Madhya Pradesh. The Chicholi city is divided into 15 wards for which elections are held every 5 years. The Chicholi Nagar Panchayat has population of 9,282 of which 4,819 are males while 4,463 are females.

Population of Children with age of 0-6 is 1101 which is 11.86% of total population of Chicholi (NP). In Chicholi Nagar Panchayat, Female Sex Ratio is of 926 against state average of 931. Moreover Child Sex Ratio in Chicholi is around 908 compared to Madhya Pradesh state average of 918. Literacy rate of Chicholi city is 90.17% higher than state average of 69.32%. In Chicholi, Male literacy is around 93.68% while female literacy rate is 86.39%.

Chicholi Nagar Panchayat has total administration over 1,936 houses to which it supplies basic amenities like water and sewerage. It is also authorize to build roads within Nagar Panchayat limits and impose taxes on properties coming under its jurisdiction.

References 

Cities and towns in Betul district